This Is Us is an American family drama television series that aired on NBC from September 20, 2016, to May 24, 2022. The series follows the lives and families of two parents, and their three children, in several different time frames. It stars an ensemble cast featuring Milo Ventimiglia, Mandy Moore, Sterling K. Brown, Chrissy Metz, Justin Hartley, Susan Kelechi Watson, Chris Sullivan, Ron Cephas Jones, Jon Huertas, Alexandra Breckenridge, Niles Fitch, Logan Shroyer, Hannah Zeile, Mackenzie Hancsicsak, Parker Bates, Eris Baker, Faithe Herman, Lonnie Chavis, Melanie Liburd, Lyric Ross, Asante Blackk, Griffin Dunne, Caitlin Thompson and Chris Geere. This Is Us was filmed in Los Angeles.

In September 2016, NBC picked up the series for a full season of 18 episodes. In January 2017, NBC renewed the series for two additional seasons of 18 episodes each, and then in May 2019, renewed if for a further three seasons.  In May 2021, it was announced that the sixth would be its final season, which premiered on January 4, 2022.

Series overview
The series follows the lives of siblings Kevin, Kate, and Randall (known as the "big three"), and their parents Jack and Rebecca Pearson. It takes place mainly in the present, but uses flashbacks and flashforwards to show other significant moments in the family's history. Kevin and Kate are the two surviving members of triplets, born six weeks premature on Jack's 36th birthday in 1980; their brother Kyle was stillborn. Believing they were meant to have three children, Jack and Rebecca decide to adopt Randall, an African-American child born earlier that day and brought to the same hospital after his biological father William Hill abandoned him at a fire station. Jack dies when his children are 17 due to a heart attack from a fire. Rebecca later marries Jack's best friend Miguel.

Randall becomes a successful finance professional and marries college classmate Beth; they raise two daughters (Tess and Annie) and adopt a third, Deja. Kevin becomes a successful actor while struggling to be taken seriously. After lacking direction much of her life, Kate meets and marries Toby, pursues a career in music, gets a degree and becomes a mom.

Most episodes feature a storyline taking place in the present (2016–2022, contemporaneous with airing) and a storyline taking place at a set time in the past. Some episodes are set in one time period, or use multiple flashback time periods. Flashbacks often focus on Jack and Rebecca circa 1980, both before and after their children's birth, or on the family when the big three are children or adolescents, and are played by two sets of younger actors; these scenes usually take place in Pittsburgh, where the big three and their parents are born and raised.

As adults, their homes vary more widely: Kate lives in Los Angeles; Randall and his family are in New Jersey and later Philadelphia; and Kevin relocates from Los Angeles to New York City and back again, with a brief return to western Pennsylvania along the way. Various other time periods and locations have also served as settings. Some episodes have focused on the earlier experiences of other characters, including Randall's family members William, Deja, and Beth. Beginning in the second season, the show also uses flashforwards to show a later time period, when Randall's daughter Tess is an adult and an elderly Rebecca is on her deathbed.

Cast and characters

Mandy Moore as Rebecca Pearson née Malone: Jack's wife; Kate and Kevin's biological mother, and Randall's adoptive mother, Miguel's wife, grandmother to Deja, Tess, and Annie Pearson, Hailey and Jack Damon, and Nicholas and Franny Pearson.
Also portrayed by Ava Castro and Kya Kruse as a child (recurring season 2–4).

Milo Ventimiglia as Jack Pearson: Rebecca's first husband, Kate and Kevin's biological, and Randall's adoptive father who died from a heart attack from smoke inhalation when his children were seventeen. 
Also portrayed by Joaquin Obradors as a child (recurring season 2–4, 6).
Sterling K. Brown as Randall Pearson: Jack and Rebecca's adopted son, Kate and Kevin's adopted brother; Beth's husband, William Hill's biological son, Tess, Annie and Deja's father, and Jack and Hailey Damon's and Franny and Nick Pearson's uncle. 
Also portrayed by Niles Fitch (ages 16–18) (recurring season 1; main season 2–6), Lonnie Chavis (ages 9–12) (recurring season 1; main season 2–5), and Caron Coleman (ages 3–6) (recurring season 4–6).
Chrissy Metz as Kate Pearson: Jack and Rebecca's biological daughter, Kevin's biological sister, and Randall's adoptive sister; Deja, Tess, Annie, Franny, and Nick's aunt; Toby's ex-wife; Phillip's wife and Jack and Hailey Damon's mother. 
Also portrayed by Hannah Zeile (ages 16–18) (recurring season 1; main season 2–6), Mackenzie Hancsicsak (ages 9–12) (recurring season 1; main season 2–5), and Isabella Rose Landau  (ages 3–6) (recurring season 4–6).
Justin Hartley as Kevin Pearson: Jack and Rebecca's biological son; Kate's biological brother, and Randall's adoptive brother, husband to Sophie, father to Nick and Franny, and uncle to Deja, Tess and Annie Pearson, and Jack and Hailey Damon.
Also portrayed by Logan Shroyer (ages 16–18) (recurring season 1; main season 2–6), Parker Bates (ages 9–12) (recurring season 1; main season 2–5), and Kaz Womack (ages 3–6) (recurring season 4–6).
Susan Kelechi Watson as Beth (Clarke) Pearson: Randall's wife, and mother of Deja, Tess and Annie. 
Also portrayed by Rachel Hilson (ages 16–18) and Akira Akbar (child).
Chris Sullivan as Toby Damon: Kate's first husband and father of Hailey and Jack Damon.
Also portrayed by Luke Clark as a teenager, and Dylan Gage as a child.
Ron Cephas Jones as William "Shakespeare" Hill: Randall's biological father (main seasons 1–2; recurring season 3–6). 
Also portrayed by Jermel Nakia as a young adult (recurring seasons 1–2 & 5; guest season 4).
Jon Huertas as Miguel Rivas: Jack's best friend and Rebecca's second husband (recurring season 1; main season 2–6).
Alexandra Breckenridge as Sophie Inman: Kate's childhood best friend, as well as Kevin's childhood love and wife (recurring seasons 1 & 6; main season 2; guest season 3–5).
Also portrayed by Amanda Leighton (ages 15–19), Sophia Coto (ages 10–12), and Kai Trueblood Fall (ages 3–6).
Eris Baker as Tess Pearson: Randall and Beth's older daughter (recurring season 1; main season 2–6). 
Also portrayed by Iantha Richardson as a young adult (guest season 2–3).
Faithe Herman as Annie Pearson: Randall and Beth's younger daughter (recurring season 1; main season 2–6).
Also portrayed by Iyana Halley as a young adult (season 6)
Melanie Liburd as Zoe Baker: Beth's cousin and Kevin's ex-girlfriend (guest seasons 2 and 5; main season 3).
Also portrayed by Brianna Reed as a teenager and Dakota Baccelli as a child (guest season 2–3).
Lyric Ross as Deja Pearson: Randall and Beth's adopted daughter (recurring season 2; main season 3–6)
Also portrayed by Makenzie Lee-Foster as a child (recurring season 2–4).
Also portrayed by La Trice Harper as a young adult (season 6)
Asante Blackk as Malik Hodges: Deja's classmate and later boyfriend; has an infant daughter from a prior romantic relationship. (main season 4–6).
Griffin Dunne as Nicholas "Nicky" Pearson: Jack's brother and Kevin, Kate and Randall's uncle (recurring seasons 3 and 5; main season 4 & 6).
Also portrayed by Michael Angarano as a young adult, and Donnie Masihi as a child (guest season 3–4; recurring season 2–4).
Caitlin Thompson as Madison Simons: Kate's best friend, and Kevin's ex-fiancé and mother of his twins, Franny and Nick. (recurring season 1–4; main season 5–6)
Chris Geere as Philip: Kate's co-worker and second husband. (guest season 5; main season 6)

Episodes

Production

Development
This is Us originally began as an 80-page movie script that Dan Fogelman was developing while working for ABC Studios in the spring of 2015. The story line, which Fogelman admitted to not having a definite direction, revolved around the lives of eight adults who, as it would be revealed, were octuplets. After moving to an eight-figure deal with 20th Century Fox Television, Fogelman made the decision to develop a television series from the characters of his original script, cutting a few characters and shortening the script to 45 pages before bringing it to the studio. Jennifer Salke, president at NBC, commented on the conception of a title for the series, saying "The title didn't come easy...but This Is Us tapped into everything, and the show's about us." It has been revealed that other ideas for the title included 36, Happy Birthday, and The Story of Us.

Despite positive reviews from both 20th Century Fox Television and its sister company, Fox, there were concerns regarding risk of attracting an audience, and Fox sold it to NBC. Fox did so because NBC promised to use the high volume of viewers from The Voice and the Summer Olympics to bring additional viewers to the series, and Fox wanted to solidify the reputation of its studio among writers and directors as placing shows where they are most likely to succeed, even if it is not Fox.

On September 27, 2016, NBC picked up the series for a full season of 18 episodes. In January 2017, NBC renewed the series for two additional seasons of 18 episodes each. The second season premiered on September 26, 2017. The third season premiered on September 25, 2018. In May 2019, NBC renewed the series for three additional seasons. The fourth season premiered on September 24, 2019. The fifth season premiered on October 27, 2020. On May 12, 2021, it was announced that the series would conclude with the sixth season. Production wrapped on May 3, 2022.

Filming locations
In addition to filming in Los Angeles, the series shot a few scenes on location in New York City, Philadelphia, and one in Memphis.

Commitment to diversity
Fogelman intentionally recruited behind-the-scenes talent that would reflect the diversity of his cast, with the goal of bringing greater authenticity to the dialog and storylines. These include black directors Regina King and George Tillman Jr., and black female writers Kay Oyegun and Jas Waters (they were part of a 30% black core writing staff; far outpacing the industry standard of 5%). In addition, Fogelman's sister Deborah, whose struggles with weight inspired one element of the show, serves as a consultant.

Release
In May 2017, Hulu acquired the SVOD rights to new and past episodes of the series to air exclusively on Hulu, in addition to NBC.com and the NBC app.

DVD releases

International versions

Reception

Critical response
Throughout every season, the series received widespread critical acclaim from critics with an average rating of 94% on Rotten Tomatoes.

The review aggregation website Rotten Tomatoes reported a 92% approval rating for the first season with an average rating of 7.6/10 based on 216 reviews. The website's critical consensus reads, "Featuring full-tilt heartstring-tugging family drama, This Is Us will provide a suitable surrogate for those who have felt a void in their lives since Parenthood went off the air." Metacritic, which uses a weighted average, assigned the season a score of 76 out of 100 based on 34 reviews, indicating "generally favorable reviews".

Season 2 received a 92% approval rating from Rotten Tomatoes based on 214 reviews, with an average score of 7.85/10. The site's consensus reads: "This is Us continues to tug at heartstrings with an emotional exploration of family that ensures viewers will want to keep the tissues close – and their loved ones closer".

Season 3 received a 94% approval rating from Rotten Tomatoes based on 165 reviews, with an average of 7.15/10. The site's consensus reads: "With a lot of love, hugs, and tears, season three of This is Us continues to please fans with new intense storylines".

Season 4 received a 91% approval rating from Rotten Tomatoes based on 11 reviews, with an average of 7.3/10 The site's consensus reads: "This Is Us reaffirms that it is more than just a mystery box in its fourth season, pressing on with some of its most central questions answered – but its emotional power intact."

Entertainment Weekly gave the show a grade B, calling it "a refreshing respite from the relational violence and pessimism that marks the other buzz soaps that have bubbled forth from a culture of divisiveness". Moreover, they praised all the actors, specifically Sterling K. Brown, for being able to navigate "his scenes with such intelligence, authenticity, and charisma".

Ratings

Note: Outside of the regular Tuesday 9:00pm timeslot, the first season's first, second and eleventh episodes aired on Tuesday at 10:00pm, along with the fifth-season finale. Additionally, the second season's fourteenth episode, "Super Bowl Sunday", aired on a Sunday at 10:15pm.

Accolades

Explanatory notes

References

External links
 
 

 
2016 American television series debuts
2022 American television series endings
2010s American comedy-drama television series
2020s American comedy-drama television series
2010s American LGBT-related drama television series
2020s American LGBT-related drama television series
Television series about dysfunctional families
English-language television shows
NBC original programming
Nonlinear narrative television series
Fiction about interracial romance
Primetime Emmy Award-winning television series
Serial drama television series
Television series by 20th Century Fox Television
Television series created by Dan Fogelman
Television series set in the 1980s
Television series set in the 1990s
Television series set in the 2000s
Television shows set in Los Angeles
Television shows set in New Jersey
Television shows set in New York City
Television shows set in Pennsylvania
Television shows set in Pittsburgh
Television shows set in Philadelphia
Television series about siblings
Television Academy Honors winners